Donald Stuart may refer to:

 Donald Stuart (minister) (1819–1894), New Zealand Presbyterian minister and educationalist
 Donald Stuart (Australian author) (1913–1983), Australian novelist
 Donald Stuart, pen name of English author Gerald Verner (1897–1980)

See also
 Don A. Stuart, pen name of American author John W. Campbell (1910–1971)
Donald Stewart (disambiguation)